"Hang It Up" is a song by English musical duo The Ting Tings, released as the lead single from their second studio album Sounds from Nowheresville. It was released as a download on 27 December 2011. It was the first song they had released since "Hands" in October 2010. The song was recorded during recording sessions in Spain in 2011. Four remixes of the song are included on the deluxe edition of the Sounds from Nowheresville album. Two of these remixes are submissions from the 'Show Us Yours' competition that was held in conjunction with their 2011 UK Tour which allowed fans to create both original artwork and their own remixes of 'Hang It Up'. The song is featured in the episode "Gone Maybe Gone" of Gossip Girl.

Music video
The video for "Hang It Up" was uploaded to the band's YouTube channel on 18 October 2011. The video was filmed in Alicante, Spain and shows the duo performing the song in a skateboard park. A video of The Ting Tings performing "Hang It Up" live in Paris was uploaded to the band's YouTube channel on 11 November 2011.

Samples
The main drum sample comes from "The Big Beat", a song by Billy Squier from 1980.

Track listing

Chart performance

Release history

References

2012 singles
The Ting Tings songs
2011 songs
Songs written by Katie White
Columbia Records singles
Songs written by Jules De Martino